The Geneva International Motor Show is an annual auto show held in March in the Swiss city of Geneva. The show is hosted at the Palexpo, a convention centre located next to the Geneva Cointrin International Airport. The Salon is organised by the Organisation Internationale des Constructeurs d'Automobiles, and is considered an important major international auto show.

First held in 1905, the Salon has hosted almost all major internal combustion engined models in the history of the automobile, along with benzene- and steam-powered cars from the beginning of the century. Exotic supercars often steal the spotlight during their debuts at the show. Prototypes, new equipment, technical breakthroughs, international partnerships, as well as political and social debates, have been announced at the exhibition. The show is regarded as a level playing field for the world's automakers, aided by the fact Switzerland lacks an auto industry of its own.

Sections
Areas of the show:
Motor cars, 3 or 4 or more wheels.
Electric cars and alternative powered cars.
Special bodywork for motor cars, car design, engineering.
Converted cars (tuners).
Accessories and parts for motor cars
OEM : original equipment manufacturers
Workshop installations for the repair and maintenance of motor cars
Miscellaneous products and services related to the car industry
Animation / Attractions.

The International Advanced Mobility Forum is the Geneva Motor Show forum on the mobility of the future.

2020s

2023
The ongoing Covid-19 pandemic along with "uncertainties in the global economy and geopolitics" in 2022 led the organisers to cancel the Swiss location for 2023 (fourth year in row) and to postpone the Qatari location until 2023. Another contributing factor was less commitments from the manufacturers for the Swiss location. The dates for Qatari exhibition were confirmed: 5 to 14 October 2023

2021 and 2022
In 2021, the Geneva International Motor Show organisers entered into an agreement with Qatari government to hold the biennal exhibitions in Qatar during the fourth quarter along with the annual exhibitions in the Switzerland during the first quarter.

The 2021 and 2022 exhibitions were cancelled due to the continued COVID-19 pandemic measures. The Qatari location was to be held in November 2022, but it was postponed to 2023 for the same reason. The global chip shortage was also cited as a factor in the 2022 cancellation of Swiss location.

2020
The 90th Geneva Motor Show was planned for 5 March to 15 March 2020, but the event was cancelled only days before it was due to start, due to the COVID-19 pandemic. Switzerland imposing a limit on gatherings of over 1,000 people was cited as the reason for the cancellation. It was one of the first of many major automotive events to be cancelled due to COVID-19.

The following vehicles were to be presented at the show in 2020:

Production cars

 ABT Sportsline Audi RS 7 Sportback
 Aiways U5
 Alfa Romeo Giulia (upgrade)
 Alfa Romeo Giulia GTA/ GTAm
 Alfa Romeo Stelvio (upgrade)
 Alpine A110 Légende GT Edition
 Alpine A110 Color Edition
 Alpina XB7
 Aspark Owl
 Aston Martin DBX by Q
 Aston Martin Vantage Roadster
 Aston Martin V12 Speedster
 Audi A3 Sportback
 Audi RS 5 (facelift)
 Audi e-tron S Sportback Prototype
 Apex AP-1
 BAC Mono
 Bentley Continental GT Mulliner Convertible
 Bentley Mulliner Bacalar
 BMW 2 Series (F44) Gran Coupé
 BMW 330e Touring
 BMW M340d xDrive
 BMW M8 Competition
 BMW X2 xDrive25e
 Brabus 800 Adventure XLP
 Brabus 800 Black & Gold Edition
 Brabus D30 based on Mercedes-Benz GLE
 Brabus D40 based on Mercedes-Benz GLS
 Brabus Mercedes-Benz EQC Upgrade kit
 Bugatti Chiron Pur Sport
 Bugatti Chiron Noire Sportive
 Changan UNI-T
 Cupra León PHEV
 Cupra Formentor
 DS 9
 Ferrari Roma
 Fiat New 500
 Fiat 500X
 Fisker Ocean EV (European debut)
 Hofele Mercedes-Benz EQC
 Honda Civic Type R (facelift)
 Honda Jazz
 Hispano Suiza Carmen Boulogne
 Hyundai i20
 Hyundai i30 (facelift)
 Karma Revero GT (European debut)
 Koenigsegg Jesko Absolut
 Koenigsegg Gemera
 Kia Seltos (European debut)
 Kia Sorento
 Kia Optima (European debut)
 Lexus LC 500 Convertible
 Lexus UX 300e
 Manifattura Automobile Torino New Stratos Racing
 Mansory Audi RS 6 Avant
 Mansory Bentley Continental GT V8 Cabrio
 Mansory Bentley Flying Spur W12
 Mansory Lamborghini Aventador SVJ Cabrera
 Mansory Lamborghini Urus Venatus
 Mansory Mercedes-AMG G63
 Mansory Mercedes-AMG G63 Star Trooper Pickup Edition by Philipp Plein
 Mansory Rolls-Royce Cullinan "Coastline"
 Mansory Xerocole based on Can-Am Maverick X3
 Mazda MX-30 EV (European debut)
 McLaren 765LT
 McLaren Elva
 McLaren GT Verdant Theme by MSO
 Mercedes-AMG E53
 Mercedes-AMG GLA35/ 45 S
 Mercedes-AMG GLE63 S Coupé 4MATIC+
 Mercedes-AMG GLS63
 Mercedes-AMG GT 73 4-door Coupé
 Mercedes-Benz E-Class (W213) (facelift)
 Mercedes-Benz E450 All-Terrain (facelift)
 Mercedes-Benz GLA (H247)
 Microlino 2.0 
 Microletta Electric Trike
 Morgan Plus Four
 Pagani Huayra Roadster BC
 Pagani Imola
 Pininfarina Battista 'Anniversario' Special Edition
 Porsche 718 Boxster GTS 4.0
 Porsche 718 Cayman GTS 4.0
 Porsche 911 Turbo S
 Puritalia Berlinetta Project SuperVEloce
 Renault Captur PHEV 'E-tech'
 Renault Clio Hybrid 'E-tech'
 Renault Mégane Estate 'E-tech' Plug-in
 Renault Twingo Z.E.
 Rimac C Two
 Roland Gumpert Nathalie "First Edition"
 Smart EQ Fortwo
 Smart EQ Forfour
 SEAT León Mk4
 Škoda Octavia RS
 Škoda Kamiq Scoutline
 Suzuki Ignis (facelift)
 Toyota GR Yaris
 Toyota Yaris
 Toyota Yaris Cross (World debut)
 Toyota Mirai (European debut)
 Toyota Supra 4-cylinder
 Toyota RAV4 Plug-in Hybrid
 Volkswagen Caddy
 Volkswagen Golf Mk8 GTD
 Volkswagen Golf Mk8 GTE
 Volkswagen Golf Mk8 GTI
 Volkswagen T-Roc Cabriolet
 Volkswagen T-Roc R
 Volkswagen Touareg R Plug-in Hybrid
 Volkswagen ID.4 Prototype
 Zenvo TSR-S (refresh)

Concept cars

 Aiways U6ion
 Alpine A110 SportsX
 Apex AP-0
 BMW Concept i4
 Czinger 21C Hybrid
 Dacia Spring Electric
 DS Aero Sport Lounge
 GFG Style 2030 eAWD (European debut)
 GFG Style Vision 2030 Desert Raid
 GFG Style Bandini Dora Barchetta EV
 Hyundai Prophecy EV
 IED Tracy EV
 Lexus LF-30 Electrified (European debut)
 Mercedes-Benz Vision AVTR
 Polestar Precept
 Renault Kangoo Z.E.
 Renault Morphoz
 Rinspeed metroSNAP
 RUF Rodeo
 Škoda Enyaq
 Vega EVX

2010s

2019
The 89th Geneva Motor Show was held between 7 and 17 March 2019.

Production cars

 Abarth 124 Rally Tribute
 Abarth 
 ABT Sportsline RS4+
 ABT Sportsline Audi A6 Avant
 ABT Sportsline Audi Q8
 ABT Sportsline Volkswagen e-Transporter
 Alfa Romeo Giulietta Veloce
 Alfa Romeo Giulia Quadrifoglio Racing Edition
 Alfa Romeo Stelvio Quadrifoglio Racing Edition
 Alfa Romeo Stelvio Ti
 Alpina B4 S Bi-turbo Edition 99
 Alpina B7 (facelift)
 Aston Martin DBS Superleggera by Q
 Aston Martin Valkyrie
 Aston Martin Vantage Cosmos Orange Edition
 Audi A6 PHEV
 Audi A7 Sportback PHEV
 Audi A8 PHEV
 Audi Q5 PHEV
 Audi SQ5 TDI
 Audi R8 V10 Decennium
 Aurus Senat
 Bentley Bentayga Speed
 Bentley Continental GT Convertible (European debut)
 Bentley Continental GT Number 9 Edition by Mulliner
 Bentley Mulsanne W.O. Edition by Mulliner
 BMW 330e Sedan
 BMW 7 Series (facelift)
 BMW 745e, 745Le, 745Le xDrive
 BMW 8 Series Convertible (European debut)
 BMW M850i xDrive Coupé Night Sky Edition
 BMW M2 Competition 
 BMW M5 Competition
 BMW X3 xDrive30e
 BMW X5 xDrive45e
 BMW X7 (European debut)
 Brabham BT62
 Brabus 800 Widestar based on Mercedes-AMG G63
 Brabus 850 6.0 Biturbo 4x42 Final Edition "1 of 5"
 Brabus 900 based on Mercedes-Maybach S650
 Brabus Ultimate E Shadow Edition
 Bugatti Chiron Sport "110 ans Bugatti"
 Bugatti Divo
 Bugatti La Voiture Noire
 Carrozzeria Touring Superleggera Sciadipersia Cabriolet
 Cupra Ateca Special Edition
 Ferrari F8 Tributo
 Fiat 500L Family 120th Anniversary Editions
 Fiat Panda Wind
 Fiat Tipo Sport 5-door
 Fornasari 311 GT "Gigi"
 Ginetta Akula
 Jeep Cherokee S/ Trailhawk
 Jeep Compass PHEV
 Jeep Compass S/ Night Eagle
 Jeep Renegade PHEV
 Jeep Renegade S/ Mopar
 Jeep Wrangler Rubicon 1941 (European debut)
 Kia e-Soul
 Koenigsegg Jesko Prototype
 Koenigsegg Regera KNC
 Lamborghini Aventador SVJ Roadster
 Lamborghini Huracán Evo
 Lexus RC F Track Edition (European debut)
 Mansory Bugatti Chiron Centuria
 Mansory Lamborghini Aventador Carbonado Evo Roadster
 Mansory Lamborghini Urus Venatus
 Mansory Mercedes-AMG G63 Star Trooper by Philipp Plein
 Mansory Mercedes-AMG S63 Apertus Edition
 Mansory Rolls-Royce Cullinan "Billionaire"
 Maserati Levante One-of-One
 Maserati Levante Trofeo Launch Edition
 Manifattura Automobili Torino New Stratos Rally
 Mazda 3 (European debut)
 Mazda CX-30
 Mazda MX-5 30th Anniversary Edition (European debut)
 McLaren 600LT Spider by MSO
 McLaren 720S GT3
 McLaren 720S Spider/ by MSO
 McLaren Speedtail
 Mercedes-AMG GT R Roadster
 Mercedes-AMG GLE 53 4Matic+
 Mercedes-AMG S65 Final Edition
 Mercedes-Benz CLA
 Mercedes-Benz GLC (facelift)
 Mercedes-Benz GLE (European debut)
 Mercedes-Benz SL 500 Grand Edition
 Mercedes-Benz SLC 300 Final Edition
 Mercedes-Benz V-Class (facelift)
 Mitsubishi ASX (facelift)
 Mitsubishi L200 (facelift)
 Mole Costruzione Artigianale Alfa Romeo 4C
 Morgan Plus 4 110 Works Edition
 Morgan Plus Six
 Nissan GTR-50 by Italdesign
 Pagani Zonda C12 001
 Peugeot 208/ e-208
 Pininfarina Battista
 Polestar 2
 Porsche 718 Boxster T
 Porsche 718 Cayman T
 Porsche 911 Carrera S/4S Cabriolet (992)
 Porsche 911 GT2 RS Clubsport (European debut)
 Porsche Macan S (facelift)
 Porsche Panamera GTS
 Puritalia Berlinetta Hybrid
 Renault Alaskan Ice Edition
 Renault Clio
 Renault Twingo (facelift)
 Rolls-Royce Cullinan
 Rolls-Royce Phantom Tranquillity
 Rolls-Royce Wraith Black Badge "Galileo Blue"
 RUF CTR Yellowbird Anniversary
 Škoda Kamiq
 Škoda Scala
 SsangYong Korando
 Startech Aston Martin Vantage
 Startech Bentley Continental GT Coupé
 Subaru Forester e-BOXER
 Subaru XV e-BOXER
 Tata Motors Altroz/ Altroz EV
 Tata Motors Buzzard Sport
 TechArt GTStreet RS
 Tesla Model S Shooting Brake by RemetzCar
 Toyota Aygo X-Cite
 Toyota Corolla GR Sport
 Toyota GR Supra (European debut)
 Volkswagen Golf GTi TCR
 Volkswagen Multivan 6.1
 Volkswagen Passat (facelift)
 Volkswagen Passat Variant R-Line Edition
 Volkswagen T-Cross
 Volkswagen Touareg V8 TDI
 Zenvo TSR-S "Grotta Azzura" Blue

Concept cars

 Alfa Romeo Tonale
 Aston Martin AM-RB 003
 Aston Martin Vanquish Vision Concept
 Aston Martin Lagonda All-Terrain
 Audi e-tron GT (European debut)
 Audi e-tron Sportback
 Audi Q4 e-tron
 BAIC Arcfox ECF
 BAIC Arcfox-GT
 Citroën Ami One Electric
 Citroën SpaceTourer "The Citroënist"
 Cupra Formentor
 e.GO Life Concept Sport
 Eadon Green Zanturi
 Engler F.F Superquad V10
 Fiat Centoventi EV
 GFG Style Kangaroo 
 Gumpert Nathalie
 Hispano-Suiza Carmen EV
 Honda e Prototype
 Honda IED Tomo EV
 Italdesign DaVinci
 Kia 'Imagine by Kia' EV
 Lexus LC Convertible (European debut)
 Mercedes-Benz EQ Silver Arrow 01 Formula E Racecar
 Mercedes-Benz EQV
 Mitsubishi Engelberg Tourer
 Mole Costruzione Artigianale Almas
 Nissan IMQ
 Nissan Leaf Nismo RC (European debut)
 PAL-V Liberty Pioneer Edition
 Peugeot 508 Sport Engineered
 Peugeot e-Legend
 Piëch Mark Zero
 Renault EZ-Ultimo
 Rinspeed microSNAP
 SEAT el-Born
 SEAT Minimo
 Škoda Vision iV
 Smart Forease+
 Subaru Viziv Adrenaline
 Tata Motors H2X
 Toyota GR Supra GT4 Concept
 VinFast LUX V8 Limited Edition
 Volkswagen ID. Buggy
 Volkswagen T-Roc R

2018
The 88th Geneva Motor Show was held on 8 to 18 March 2018.

Production cars

 Abarth 124 GT
 Abarth 695 Rivale
 ABT Sportsline RS4-R Avant
 ABT Sportsline RS5-R
 Alfa Romeo 4C Competizione Coupe & Italia Spider
 Alfa Romeo Giulia Quadrifoglio Nurburgring Edition
 Alfa Romeo Giulia Veloce Ti
 Alfa Romeo Stelvio Quadrifoglio Nurburgring Edition
 Alpina XD3
 Alpina XD4
 Alpine A110 Pure & Légende
 Arden AJ23 (based on the Jaguar F-Type SVR Coupe)
 Arden Range Rover AR20
 Aston Martin DB11 Volante (European debut)
 Aston Martin V8 Vantage
 Aston Martin Racing V8 Vantage GTE
 Audi A6
 Audi A7 Sportback (European debut)
 Bentley Bentayga Hybrid
 Bentley Bentayga V8
 BMW 2 Series Active Tourer & Gran Tourer (European debut)
 BMW i8 Roadster (European debut)
 BMW M2 Black Shadow Edition
 BMW M3 CS (European debut)
 BMW X2 (European debut)
 BMW X4
 Brabus 800 based on MB E63S and S63 Coupe
 Bugatti Chiron Sport
 Citroën Berlingo
 Citroën C4 Cactus
 Cupra Ateca
 David Brown Automotive Mini Remastered
 David Brown Automotive Speedback GT Silverstone Edition
 Ferrari 488 Pista
 Ferrari Portofino
 Fiat 124 Spider S-Design
 Fiat 500X S-Design
 Fiat Tipo S-Design
 Ford Edge (facelift) (European debut)
 Ford Ka+
 Ford Mustang Bullitt (European debut)
 Hennessey Venom F5 (European debut)
 Honda Civic Type R TCR
 Hyundai Kona Electric
 Hyundai Nexo FCV (European debut)
 Hyundai Santa Fe
 Iconiq model SEVEN (European debut)
 Italdesign Zerouno Duerta
 Jaguar I-Pace
 Jeep Cherokee (European debut)
 Jeep Grand Cherokee Trackhawk (European debut)
 Jeep Wrangler (European debut)
 Kia Ceed Hatchback & Sportswagon
 Kia Optima EU-Spec. (facelift)
 Kia Rio GT-Line
 Koenigsegg Regera Ghost Package
 Lamborghini Huracán Performante Spyder
 Lamborghini Urus
 Lexus UX
 Manifattura Automobili Torino New Stratos
 Mansory Aston Martin DB11 Cyrus
 Mansory Bentley Bentayga Bleurion Edition
 Mansory Ferrari 812 Superfast Stallone
 Mansory McLaren 720S
 Mansory Rolls-Royce Phantom Bushukan Edition
 Maserati Ghibli, Quattroporte and Levante Nerissimo Edition (European debut)
 Mazda6 Sedan (European debut)
 Mazda6 Tourer
 McLaren Senna
 McLaren Senna Carbon Theme by MSO
 Mercedes-AMG C43 Sedan (facelift)
 Mercedes-AMG G63
 Mercedes-AMG GT 4-Door Coupé
 Mercedes-Benz A-Class (W177)
 Mercedes-Benz C-Class (facelift)
 Mercedes-Benz CLA Shooting Brake Night Edition
 Mercedes-Benz G-Class (European debut)
 Mercedes-Benz X-Class V6 4MATIC
 Mercedes-Maybach S-Class (facelift)
 Mitsubishi Outlander PHEV (facelift)
 Mini Cooper Hardtop & Cabrio (facelift) (European debut)
 Morgan Aero GT
 Morgan Plus 8 50th Anniversary Special Edition
 Pagani Zonda HP Barchetta (European debut)
 PAL-V Liberty Flying Car
 Peugeot 308 TCR
 Peugeot 508 Mk2
 Peugeot Rifter
 Pininfarina H2 Speed
 Polestar 1 (European debut)
 Porsche 911 Carrera T (European debut)
 Porsche 911 GT3 RS (facelift)
 Renault Zoe R110
 Rimac C Two
 Rolls-Royce Dawn 'Aero Cowling'
 Ruf SCR 2018
 Seat León Cupra R ST
 Sin Cars R1 550 Plug-in Hybrid
 Škoda Fabia (facelift)
 Škoda Kodiaq Laurin & Klement
 Škoda Octavia RS Challenge Plus
 SsangYong Musso
 TechArt GrandGT Supreme Sport Turismo
 Touring Superleggera Sciadipersia
 Toyota Auris
 Toyota Aygo (facelift)
 Volvo V60
 W Motors Fenyr SuperSport (European debut)
 Zenvo TSR-S

Concept cars

 Aston Martin Lagonda Vision Concept
 Aston Martin Valkyrie AMR Pro
 Audi e-tron SUV
 BMW M8 Gran Coupe
 Corbellati Missile
 Cupra e-Racer
 E'mobile Microlino
 E'mobile eRod Offroad Kybruz
 E'mobile Autonom Cab Navya
 Eadon Green Zeclat
 Formula E Gen2
 GFG Style Sybilla
 Honda Sports EV (European debut)
 Hyundai Le Fil Rouge
 IED Hyundai Kite
 Icona Nucleus
 Lamborghini Terzo Millennio
 Lexus LF-1 Limitless (European debut)
 LVCHI Venere
 Mazda Kai (European debut)
 Mazda Vision Coupe (European debut)
 McLaren Senna GTR
 Mitsubishi e-Evolution (European debut)
 Nissan Formula E concept livery
 Nissan IMx KURO (European debut)
 Peugeot Rifter 4x4
 Pininfarina HK GT
 Porsche Mission E Cross Turismo
 Range Rover SV Coupé
 Renault EZ-GO
 Rinspeed Snap
 Sbarro 4x4+2
 Sbarro GTC
 SsangYong e-SIV
 Škoda Vision X
 Subaru Viziv Tourer
 Tata H5X (European debut)
 Tata EVision
 Techrules Ren RS
 Toyota Fine-Comfort Ride (European debut)
 Toyota GR Supra Racing Concept
 Volkswagen I.D. Vizzion
 Zagato IsoRivolta Vision Gran Turismo

2017
The 87th Geneva Motor Show was held from 9 to 19 March 2017.

Production cars

 Abarth 595 Pista
 Alfa Romeo Stelvio (European debut)
 Alpina B3 S Bi-Turbo
 Alpina B4 S Bi-Turbo
 Alpina Alpina B5 Bi-Turbo (G30/G31)
 Alpine A110
 Aston Martin DB11 Q
 Aston Martin Valkyrie
 Aston Martin Vanquish S Volante
 Audi RS3 Sportback (facelift)
 Audi A5 Sportback g-tron
 Audi SQ5 (European debut)
 Audi RS5 Coupe
 Bentley Bentayga Mulliner
 Bentley Continental Supersports (European debut)
 Bentley Mulsanne Hallmark Series by Mulliner
 Bentley Flying Spur W12 S
 BMW 4 Series (facelift)
 BMW 5 Series Touring
 Brabus 550 Adventure 4x42
 Brabus 650 Cabrio
 Dacia Logan MCV Stepway
 David Brown Automotives Speedback GT
 DS 7 Crossback
 Ferrari 812 Superfast
 Fiat 124 Spider Europa
 Fiat 500 Sessantesimo Limited Edition
 Fiat Fullback Cross
 Ford Fiesta
 Ford Fiesta ST
 Ford GT 66 Heritage
 Gemballa Avalanche
 Honda Civic Type R
 Hyundai i30 Wagon
 Infiniti Q50 (facelift)
 Italdesign Zerouno
 Jeep Compass (European debut)
 Kahn Vengeance Volante
 Kia Picanto
 Kia Stinger (European debut)
 Koenigsegg Agera RS Gryphon
 Lamborghini Aventador S
 Lamborghini Huracán Performante
 Land Rover Range Rover Velar
 Lexus LS 500h
 Maserati GranTurismo Sport Special Edition
 Mazda CX-5 (European debut)
 Mazda MX-5 RF (European debut)
 McLaren 720S
 Mercedes-Benz E-Class Cabriolet
 Mercedes-Benz E-Class Coupe
 Mercedes-AMG E63 S Estate
 Mercedes-AMG GT C Roadster Edition 50
 Mercedes-Maybach G650 Landaulet
 Mercedes-Benz GLA (refresh) (European debut)
 Mitsubishi Eclipse Cross
 Nissan Qashqai (facelift)
 Noble M600 Speedster
 Opel Insignia Grand Sport
 Opel Insignia Sports Tourer
 Opel Crossland X
 Pagani Huayra Roadster
 Porsche Panamera Sports Turismo
 Porsche Panamera Turbo S E-Hybrid
 Porsche 911 GT3 (facelift)
 Porsche 911 Carrera 4 GTS
 Porsche 911 Targa 4 GTS
 Porsche 911 R by Tag Heuer
 Renault Alaskan (European debut)
 Renault Captur (facelift)
 Renault Koleos II (European debut)
 Rimac Concept One
 Rolls-Royce Ghost Elegance
 RUF CTR 2017
 Scuderia Cameron Glickenhaus SCG 003
 SEAT Ibiza
 SEAT León Cupra (facelift)
 Škoda Citigo (facelift)
 Sin Cars R1 550
 Škoda Rapid (facelift)
 Škoda Octavia RS 245
 Škoda Kodiaq Sportline and Scout
 Smart Forfour crosstown edition
 Smart Fortwo cabrio Brabus edition No. 2
 Spyker C8 Preliator Spyder
 Subaru XV / Crosstrek
 Suzuki Swift
 TechArt Magnum Sport
 TechArt GrandGT
 TechArt GTStreet R Cabriolet
 Toyota Yaris (second facelift)
 Toyota Yaris GRMN
 Volkswagen Arteon
 Volkswagen Golf R (facelift)
 Volkswagen Tiguan Allspace
 Volvo XC60
 Zenvo TS1 GT

Concept cars

 Artega Scalo Superelletra
 Aston Martin Rapide AMR
 Aston Martin Vantage AMR Pro
 Audi Q8 Sport
 Bentley EXP 12 Speed 6e
 Cadillac Escala (European debut)
 Chevrolet Camaro Track concept
 Citroën C-Aircross
 Eadon Green Black Cuillin
 Honda NeuV (European debut)
 Hyundai FE Fuel Cell
 Infiniti Q60 Project Black S
 Italdesign AirBus PopUp Flying Car
 Jaguar I-Pace (European debut)
 Land Rover Discovery Project Hero
 Mercedes-AMG GT Concept
 Mercedes-Benz Concept X-Class
 Nissan BladeGlider (European debut)
 Peugeot Instinct
 Pininfarina Fittipaldi EF7 Vision GT
 Pininfarina H600
 Quant 48Volt
 Renault Trezor
 Renault Zoe E-Sport
 Rinspeed Oasis
 Sbarro Mojave
 SsangYong XAVL
 Tata Tamo Racemo
 Techrules Ren
 Toyota i-TRIL
 Vanda Dendrobium
 Volkswagen I.D. Buzz (European debut)
 Volkswagen Sedric

2016
The 86th Geneva Motor Show was held from 3 to 13 March 2016.

Production cars

 Abarth 124 Spider
 Alfa Romeo Giulia
 Alpina B7 (G12)
 Apollo N
 Arash AF8 Cassini
 Arash AF10
 Aston Martin DB11
 Audi Q2
 Audi S4 Avant
 Bentley Flying Spur V8 S
 Bentley Mulsanne
 Bentley Mulsanne Grand Limousine Mulliner
 BMW Alpina B7 xDrive
 BMW M760Li xDrive
 BMW M2 Coupé M Performance Package
 Brabus 900 Rocket Coupe
 Bugatti Chiron
 Chevrolet Camaro (sixth generation) (European debut)
 Chevrolet Corvette Grand Sport
 Citroën SpaceTourer
 Dodge Viper ACR (European debut)
 Ferrari California T Handling Speciale
 Ferrari GTC4Lusso
 Fiat Tipo
 Ford Fiesta ST200
 Ford Kuga (refresh)
 Honda Clarity Fuel Cell (European debut)
 Genesis G90 (European debut)
 Hyundai Ioniq electric drive line-up
 Infiniti Q50 (refresh) (European debut)
 Infiniti Q60 (European debut)
 Infiniti QX30 (European debut)
 Jaguar F-Type SVR
 Kahn Vengeance
 Kia Niro (European debut)
 Kia Optima Sportswagon
 Koenigsegg Agera Final Edition One of 1
 Koenigsegg Regera
 Lamborghini Centenario
 Lamborghini Huracán LP610-4 Avio
 Land Rover Range Rover Evoque Convertible
 Lexus LC 500h
 Lotus 3-Eleven
 Lotus Elise Cup 250
 Lotus Evora Sport 410
 Maserati Levante
 McLaren 570GT
 McLaren 675LT Spider by MSO
 McLaren P1 by MSO
 Mercedes-AMG SLC43 (European debut)
 Mercedes-Benz C-Class Cabriolet, Mercedes-AMG C43 Cabriolet
 Morgan EV3
 Opel Mokka X
 Pagani Huayra BC
 Peugeot Traveller
 Porsche 718 Boxster
 Porsche 911 R
 Radical RXC Turbo 500R
 Renault Scénic
 Renault Talisman
 Rimac Concept One
 Rolls-Royce Ghost Black Badge
 Rolls-Royce Wraith Black Badge
 Secma F16 Turbo
 SEAT Ateca
 Spyker C8 Preliator
 Sin Cars R1
 Suzuki SX4 Cross (facelift)
 Tesla Model X (European debut)
 Toyota C-HR
 Toyota ProAce Verso
 Volkswagen Phideon
 Volvo V40 (refresh)
 Volvo V90
 Volvo XC90 Excellence (European debut)
 W Motors Lykan HyperSport
 Zenvo TS1

Concept cars

 AC Schnitzer ACL2
 Alpine Vision
 Apollo Arrow
 Citroën SpaceTourer Hyphen
 DS E-Tense
 Honda Civic Hatchback Prototype
 Italdesign GTZero
 Lexus LF-FC (European debut)
 Mazda RX-Vision
 Mitsubishi ASX Geoseek
 Mitsubishi L200 Geoseek
 Nissan Qashqai Premium
 Nissan X-Trail Premium
 Opel GT Concept
 Pininfarina H2 Speed
 Rimac Concept S
 Rinspeed Ʃtos
 Sbarro Ginevra
 Sbarro Haze
 Škoda Vision S
 SsangYong SIV-2
 Techrules AT96 TREV
 Carrozzeria Touring Superleggera Disco Volante Spyder
 Volkswagen T-Cross Breeze

2015
The 85th Geneva Motor Show was held from 5 to 15 March 2015.

Production cars

 Alfa Romeo 4C Spider
 Alpina B6 Edition 50
 Aston Martin Lagonda Taraf
 Aston Martin Vantage GT3
 Aston Martin Vulcan
 Audi Q7
 Audi R8
 Bentley Continental GT Speed (facelift)
 BMW 1 Series (facelift)
 BMW 2 Series Gran Tourer
 Bugatti Veyron Grand Sport Vitesse La Finale
 Cadillac ATS-V Coupe (European debut)
 Cadillac CTS-V (European debut)
 Citroën Berlingo Multispace
 Ferrari 488 GTB
 Fiat 500 Vintage '57
 Ford Focus RS
 Ford GT
 GTA Spano
 Honda Civic Type R
 Honda Jazz (European debut)
 Honda HR-V (European debut)
 Honda NSX
 Hyundai i20 Coupe
 Hyundai i30 (facelift)
 Hyundai i40 (facelift)
 Hyundai Tucson
 Koenigsegg Agera RS
 Koenigsegg Regera
 Lamborghini Aventador LP 750-4 Superveloce
 Land Rover Range Rover Evoque (facelift)
 Lexus GS F (European debut)
 Lotus Evora 400
 Mazda6 (facelift)
 Mazda CX-3 (European debut)
 Mazda CX-5 (facelift)
 McLaren 675LT
 McLaren P1 GTR
 Mercedes-AMG GT3
 Mercedes-Benz G500 4×42
 Mercedes-Maybach S600 Pullman
 Mitsubishi Triton (L200)
 Morgan Aero8
 Opel Karl (Vauxhall Viva)
 Opel Corsa OPC
 Peugeot 208 (facelift)
 Pininfarina Ferrari Sergio
 Porsche 918 Spyder
 Porsche 911 GT3 RS
 Porsche Cayman GT4
 Quant F
 Radical RXC Turbo 500
 Renault Kadjar
 Rolls-Royce Phantom Serenity
 Ruf Turbo Florio
 SEAT León ST Cupra 280
 Skoda Superb
 Subaru Levorg
 SsangYong Tivoli
 Toyota Auris (facelift)
 Toyota Avensis (2nd facelift)
 Touring Superleggera Berlinetta Lusso
 Volkswagen Sharan MK2 (facelift)
 Volkswagen Touran MK3
 Volkswagen Passat Alltrack
 Volvo S60 Cross Country

Concept cars

 Aston Martin DBX
 Audi Prologue Avant
 Bentley EXP 10 Speed 6
 Citroën Berlingo Mountain Vibe Concept
 Infiniti QX30
 Italdesign Giugiaro Gea
 Kia Sportspace
 Lexus LF-SA
 Magna Steyr Mila Plus Hybrid
 Nissan Sway
 Peugeot Quartz
 Quantino
 SEAT 20V20
 Suzuki iM-4
 Volkswagen Sport Coupe Concept GTE

2014
The 84th Geneva Motor Show was held from 6 to 16 March 2014.

Production cars

 Abarth 695 Biposto
 Abt Audi RS6-R Avant
 Alpina B4 Biturbo Cabriolet
 Aston Martin V8 Vantage N430
 Audi S1
 Audi S3 Cabriolet
 Audi TT
 Bentley Flying Spur V8
 BMW 2 Series Active Tourer
 BMW 4 Series Gran Coupé
 BMW M4 Coupe
 BMW X4
 Brabus B63S-700 6x6
 Bugatti Veyron Rembrandt
 Citroën C1
 Citroën C4 Cactus
 Ferrari California T
 Fiat Freemont Cross
 Fiat Panda Cross
 Ford Focus (facelift)
 Jaguar XFR-S Sportbrake
 Jeep Renegade
 Koenigsegg One:1
 Lamborghini Huracán LP610-4
 Lexus RC F Sport
 Maserati Quattroporte Ermenegildo Zegna Limited Edition
 McLaren 650S
 Mercedes-Benz S-Class Coupé
 Mercedes-Benz V-Class
 Nissan e-NV200
 Nissan GT-R NISMO (European début)
 Nissan Juke
 Opel Adam Rocks
 Opel Astra OPC Extreme
 Pagani Zonda Revolucion
 Peugeot 108
 Peugeot 308 SW
 Porsche 911 RSR Racecar
 Porsche 919 Hybrid LMP1
 Qoros 3 Hatch
 Renault Twingo
 Rolls-Royce Ghost Series II
 Toyota Aygo
 Volkswagen Golf GTE (plug-in hybrid)
 Volkswagen Polo (facelift)
 Volkswagen Scirocco (facelift)
 Zenvo ST1

Concept cars

 Alfa Romeo 4C Spider
 Audi TT Quattro Sport
 Honda Civic Type R
 Hyundai Intrado
 IED Hyundai PassoCorto
 Infiniti Q50 Eau Rouge
 Italdesign Giugiaro Clipper
 Maserati Alfieri
 Mazda Hazumi
 Mini Clubman Concept
 Quant E
 Rinspeed XchangE
 Škoda VisionC
 SsangYong XLV
 Subaru Viziv 2 
 Volkswagen Multivan Alltrack
 Volkswagen T-Roc
 Volvo Concept Estate

2013
The 83rd Geneva Motor Show was held from 7 to 17 March 2013.

Production cars

 Alfa Romeo 4C
 Alfa Romeo MiTo SBK
 Aston Martin Rapide S
 Aston Martin Vanquish
 Audi A3 Sportback G-tron
 Audi RS Q3
 Audi RS5 Coupe DTM
 Audi RS6 Avant
 Audi RS7 Sportback
 Audi S3 Sportback
Bentley Flying Spur
 BMW 3 Series Gran Turismo
 Brabus 800 Roadster
 Brabus PI 800 Widestar
 Brabus CLS B63 S 730
 Brabus CLS Shooting Brake B63 S 730
 Brabus B63-620 Widestar
 Cadillac ATS (European introduction)
 Chevrolet Captiva (2nd facelift)
 Chevrolet Corvette Stingray Convertible
 Chevrolet Spark EV
 Citroën C3 (facelift)
 Citroën DS4 "Electro Shot"
 Dacia Logan MCV
 Exagon Furtive e-GT
 LaFerrari
 Fiat 500e
 Fiat 500L Trekking
 Ford EcoSport (European introduction)
 Ford Tourneo Courier
 Ford Tourneo Custom
 Ford Tourneo Connect
 Gemballa MP4-12C Spider
 Gumpert Apollo S
 GTA Spano
 Hyundai Grand Santa Fe
 Hyundai ix35 (facelift)
 Infiniti Q50
 Jeep Compass (facelift, European introduction)
 Jeep Grand Cherokee
 Jeep Wrangler Rubicon
 Kia cee'd GT
 Kia pro cee'd GT
Lamborghini Veneno
 Lexus IS
 Maserati Quattroporte
 McLaren P1
 Mercedes-Benz A 45 AMG
 Mercedes-Benz CLA (European introduction)
 Mercedes-Benz E-Class (facelift)
 Mini Paceman John Cooper Works
Nissan Note
Opel Cascada
Peugeot 208 GTi
Peugeot 2008
Porsche 918
Porsche 911 GT3 (Type 991)
Porsche Cayman
 Qoros 3 Sedan
 Renault Captur
 Renault Scénic and Grand Scénic (2nd facelift)
 Renault Scénic XMOD
 Renault Kangoo Express
 Renault Kangoo Maxi Z.E.
Rolls-Royce Wraith
 Ruf CTR3 Clubsport
 Seat León III SC
Škoda Octavia III
 SsangYong Rodius
Suzuki SX4
 Toyota RAV4
 Toyota Auris Touring Sports
 Volkswagen Cross up!
 Volkswagen Golf VII GTI and GTD
 Volkswagen Golf VII Variant BlueMotion
 Volkswagen XL1
 Volvo S60/V60
 Volvo XC60
 Volvo S80/V70/XC70
 Volvo V60 D6 Plug-In Hybrid
 Wiesmann GT MF4-CS

Concept cars

Alfa Romeo Gloria
 Aston Martin Rapide Bertone Jet 2+2
 Audi A3 e-Tron
 Belumbury Lallo Concept
 Belumbury Dany Concept
 Citroën C3 Hybrid Air Concept
 Citroën Technospace
 Fiat 500 "GQ" Showcar
 Fornasari Hunter
 Fornasari Gigi
 Honda Civic Tourer Concept
 Hyundai i20 WRC Prototype
 IMA Colibri
 Italdesign Giugiaro Parcour and Roadster
 Kia Provo Concept
 Koenigsegg Agera S "Hundra"
 Land Rover Electric Defender Research Vehicle
 Mitsubishi CA-MiEV
 Mitsubishi GR-HEV
Opel Adam Rocks
 Opel Adam R2 Rally Car Concept
 Peugeot RCZ View Top Concept by Magna Steyr
 Pininfarina Sergio
 Qoros 3 Cross Hybrid Concept
 Qoros 3 Estate Concept
 Rinspeed microMAX
 Sbarro React'E.V. Concept
 Spyker B6 Venator
 SsangYong SIV-1 Concept
 Subaru Viziv
 Toyota Auris Touring Sports Black Concept
 Toyota FT-86 Open
 Toyota i-Road
 Toyota RAV4 Adventure Concept
 Toyota RAV4 Premium Concept
 Valmet Eva Range Extender Concept
 Volkswagen e-Co-Motion Concept
 Volkswagen Golf Variant Concept R-Line

2012

The 82nd edition was held from 8 to 18 March 2012.

Production cars

Abarth 695 Tributo Maserati Convertible
Alpina B5 (F10) (facelift)
Artega GT Roadster
Aston Martin V8 (facelift)
Aston Martin V12 Zagato
Audi A1 Quattro
Audi A3
Audi A4 (facelift)
Audi RS4 Avant
Audi A6 allroad quattro
Audi TT RS Plus
Audi SQ3
Bentley Continental GT V8
Bentley Mulsanne Mulliner Driving Specification
Alpina B5 Biturbo (F10)
BMW 5 Series (F10) M550d
BMW M6 CC
BMW 6 Series (F06) Gran Coupé
Brabus Bullit Coupe 800
Bugatti Veyron Grand Sport Vitesse
Chevrolet Cruze SW
Citroën C1 (2nd facelift)
Citroën C4 Aircross
Dacia Lodgy
Ferrari California (facelift)
Ferrari F12 Berlinetta
Fiat 500L
Ford B-MAX
Ford F-Series Super Duty
Ford Fiesta ST
Ford Kuga
Gumpert Apollo R
Honda Civic D
Honda CR-V (European introduction)
Hyundai i20 (facelift)
Hyundai i30 CrossWagon
Isuzu D-MAX
Jaguar XF Sportbrake
Kia cee'd and SW
Kia K9
Lancia Flavia Cabrio
Lexus GS F-Sport
Lexus RX 450h
Maserati GranTurismo Sport
Mercedes-Benz A-Class
Mercedes-Benz SL-Class
Mini Countryman John Cooper Works
Mitsubishi Outlander
Morgan Plus 8
Nissan Juke Nismo
Opel Astra OPC
Opel Insignia Cross Four
Opel Mokka
Peugeot 107 (2nd facelift)
Peugeot 208
Peugeot 4008
Porsche Boxster (Type 981)
Renault Mégane (facelift)
Renault Scénic & Renault Grand Scénic (facelift)
Renault Zoe
Rolls-Royce Phantom (facelift)
Ruf RGT-8
SEAT Mii
Škoda Citigo
Smart electric drive and Smart Brabus electric drive
Smart fortwo (facelift)
Ssangyong Korando
Subaru Impreza
Subaru BRZ
Toyota Aygo (2nd facelift)
Toyota GT 86
Toyota Prius
Toyota Yaris Hybrid
Volkswagen up! 5-door
Volkswagen Polo BlueGT
Volkswagen Golf Cabriolet GTI
Volkswagen Passat Alltrack
Volvo V40

Concept cars

AC 378 GT Zagato
Bentley EXP 9 F
Bertone Nuccio Concept
BMW M135i
Carrozzeria Touring Superleggera Disco Volante
Citroën DS4 Racing
Ford Tourneo
Giugiaro Brivido
Honda NSX
Hyundai i-oniq
Infiniti Emerg-e
Jeep Compass
Jeep Grand Cherokee Sport
Lamborghini Aventador J
Lyonheart K
Magna Steyr MILA Coupic
Mazda Takeri
Mini Clubvan
Mitsubishi i-MiEV Prototype (Pikes Peak)
Nissan Hi-Cross
Nissan Invitation
Peugeot 208 GTi and XY
Pininfarina Cambiano
Range Rover Evoque Convertible Concept
Rinspeed Dock+Go
SEAT Toledo Concept
SsangYong XIV-2
Suzuki Swift Range Extender
Tata Megapixel
Tesla Model S
Tesla Model X
Toyota FT-Bh
Volkswagen Amarok Canyon
Volkswagen Cargo up!, Swiss up!, X up!, and Winter up!
Volkswagen Cross Coupé TDI Hybrid

2011

The 2011 edition was held from 3 to 13 March 2011.

Production cars

AC Cars MkVI
Aston Martin Cygnet
Aston Martin Virage
Aston Martin V8 Vantage S
Audi RS3 Sportback
Audi Q5 Hybrid
Bentley Continental Supersports Ice Speed Edition
Bentley Flying Spur Series 51
BMW ActiveE
BMW 320d EfficientDynamics Touring Edition
BMW X1 xDrive28i (turbo I4)
Chevrolet Camaro ZL1 (European début)
Chevrolet Cruze Hatchback (final production version)
Citroën DS4
Ferrari FF
Fiat 500 Gucci
Fiat Freemont
Ford C-Max Hybrid (European debut)
Ford C-Max Energi plug-in hybrid (European debut)
Ford Focus Electric (European debut)
Ford Metal Ka
Ford Ranger Wildtrak
GTA Spano
Honda Accord (facelift)
Hyundai i40
Jaguar XKR-S
Jeep Grand Cherokee (European début)
Kia Picanto
Kia Rio
Koenigsegg Agera R
Lamborghini Aventador LP700-4
Lancia Grand Voyager
Lancia Thema
Lancia Ypsilon
Maserati Gran Cabrio Sport
Mercedes-Benz C-Class Coupe
Mercedes-Benz SLK
Morgan ThreeWheeler
Opel Ampera
Opel Antara (facelift)
Opel Corsa (facelift)
Pagani Huayra
Peugeot 308 (facelift)
Peugeot 3008 hybride HDi
Porsche Panamera S Hybrid
Saab 9-5 SportCombi
Ssangyong Korando
Subaru Trezia
Suzuki Swift Sport
Toyota Prius+
Toyota Yaris HSD Hybrid
Volkswagen Golf Cabriolet
Volkswagen Tiguan facelift

Concept cars

Alfa Romeo 4C
Audi A3 Sedan Concept
BMW Vision ConnectedDrive
Cadillac Urban Luxury
Citroën Metropolis
De Tomaso Deauville
Fiat 500 Coupé Zagato
Ford B-MAX
Ford Vertrek (European debut)
Fornasari RR99
Gumpert Tornante
Honda EV
Infiniti Etherea
Jaguar B99 by Bertone
Lancia Flavia/Flavia Cabrio concepts
Land Rover Range_e
Mazda Minagi
Mini Rocketman
Mitsubishi Concept Global Small
Nissan Esflow
Opel Zafira Tourer Concept
Renault Captur
Rinspeed BamBoo
Rolls-Royce 102EX (Phantom Experimental Electric)
Saab PhoeniX
Skoda Vision D
Smart Forspeed
Tata Pixel
Toyota FT-86 II
Toyota iQ EV (pre-production)
Volkswagen Bulli
Volvo V60 Plug-in Hybrid (pre-production)

2010
The 80th edition of the Geneva Motor Show was held from 4–14 March 2010. Over 80 introductions were expected for the show. Press days for the show started on 2 March 2010, when most of the major introductions occurred.

Production cars

Alfa Romeo Giulietta
 Alpina B3 S
 Audi A1
 Audi RS5
 Bentley Continental Supersports Convertible
 BMW 5 Series (F10)
 Carlsson C25
 Dacia Duster
 Ford C-Max / Grand C-Max (production versions)
 Ford Focus (European debut)
 Garia LSV (Low Speed Vehicle)
 Infiniti M35 Hybrid
 Jaguar XKR Special Edition
 Kia Sportage
 Koenigsegg Agera
 Lamborghini Gallardo LP570-4 Superleggera
 Lexus CT 200h
 Lotus Elise
 Lotus Evora Cup
 Mazda 6
 Mazda 5
 Mini Countryman
 Mitsubishi ASX
 Nissan 370Z Roadster (European début)
Nissan Global Compact Car
 Nissan Juke
 Nissan Navara
 Nissan Pathfinder
 Nissan Qashqai
 Opel Meriva
 Pagani Zonda Tricolore
 Porsche 911 Turbo S
 Porsche Cayenne
 Renault Mégane Convertible
 Renault Wind
 Rolls-Royce Ghost by Mansory
 Ruf RGT-8
 SEAT Ibiza ST
 Volkswagen CrossPolo
 Volkswagen Polo BlueMotion
 Volkswagen Polo GTI
 Volkswagen Sharan
 Volkswagen Touareg
 Volvo S60

Concept cars

 Alfa Romeo 2uettottanta by Pininfarina
 Aston Martin Cygnet
 Audi A1 E-Tron
 Bertone Alfa Romeo Pandion
BMW Concept 5 Series ActiveHybrid
 BMW Concept ActiveE (European début)
 Bufori Geneva
 Bugatti 16C Galibier
 Chevrolet Aveo RS (European début)
 Citroën DS High Rider
 DOK-ING XD
 Ferrari 599 GTB HY-KERS Hybrid
 GQ by Citroën
 Honda 3R-C
 Hispano-Suiza
 Hyundai i-flow diesel-electric hybrid
 I.DE.A Institute Sofia
 KSU Gazal-1
 Lotus Evora 414E Hybrid
 Mitsubishi Concept cX
 Mercedes-Benz F800
 Opel Flextreme GT/E
 Peugeot SR1
 5 by Peugeot
 Porsche 918 Spyder Plug-in Hybrid
 Proton Concept Car by Italdesign Giugiaro
 Rinspeed UC (electric micro vehicle)
 SEAT IBE
 Tata Nano EV
 Valmet Eva

2000s

2009
The 2009 Geneva Motor Show was held from 5–15 March 2009.  The following vehicles were introduced:

Production cars

 Alpina B6 GT3 racecar
 Alpina B7 (F01/F02)
 Artega GT Roadster
 Aston Martin V12 Vantage
 Aston Martin DBS Volante
 Aston Martin One-77
 Audi A4 allroad
 Audi TT RS
 Bentley Continental Supersports
 Bitter Vero Sport (rebodied Holden Commodore SS (VE))
 Brabus G V12 S Biturbo
 Cadillac SRX (European debut)
 Chevrolet Spark (European debut)
 DR2
 Ferrari 599 GTB Fiorano Handling GT Evoluzione package
 Ferrari 599XX
Fiat 500C
 Ford Focus RS (final production version)
 Ford Ranger (European debut)
 Hyundai i20 3-door
 Lamborghini Murciélago LP670-4 SV
 Lotus Exige S
 Maybach Zeppelin
 Mazdaspeed3
 Mercedes-Benz E-Class Coupé
 Mini Cooper S Convertible JCW
 Opel Ampera
 Pagani Zonda Cinque
 Peugeot 206+
 Porsche 911 GT3
 Renault Clio (facelift)
 Renault Mégane Sport Tourer
 Renault Scénic / Grand Scénic
 Saab 9-3X
 Škoda Yeti
 Spyker C8 Aileron
 Tata Indica EV
 Tata Nano
 Toyota Verso
 Volkswagen Polo
 Volvo S80
 Wiesmann MF4-S
 Zagato Perana Z-One

Concept cars

 Alfa Romeo MiTo GTA (prototype/concept)
 Aston Martin Lagonda
 BMW 5 Series Gran Turismo
 Citroën DS Inside
 Dacia Duster
 Ford iosis MAX
 Giugiaro Namir Hybrid
 Hyundai Ix-onic
 Infiniti Essence
 Kia No.3
 Koenigsegg Quant
 Nissan Qazana
 Rinspeed E2
 Rinspeed iChange
 Rolls Royce 200EX
 Subaru Legacy

2008
The 2008 Geneva Motor Show was held from 6–16 March 2008. The following vehicles were introduced:

Production cars

 500 Abarth
 Alfa Romeo 8C Spider
 Artega GT
 Audi A3 Cabriolet
 Audi Q5
 Audi Q7 V12 TDI
 Bentley Continental GTZ Zagato
 Bitter Vero (rebodied Holden Caprice)
 BMW M3 Cabriolet
 Brabus Mercedes-Benz SLR McLaren Roadster
 Bugatti Veyron Hermes
 Chevrolet Aveo 3-door
 Citroën Berlingo
 Citroën C5
 Dacia Sandero
 Fiat Fiorino Qubo
 Ford Fiesta
 Ford Focus Coupé-Cabriolet
 Ford Kuga
 Honda Accord (European version)
 Honda Fit (European version)
 Infiniti FX
 Jaguar XKR-S
 KTM X-Bow Dallara
 Lamborghini Gallardo LP560-4
 Lancia Delta
 Maserati GranTurismo S
 Mercedes-Benz CLC Coupé
 Mercedes-Benz CLS-Class (W219) (facelift)
 Mercedes-Benz SL (facelift)
 Mercedes-Benz SL63 AMG
 Mercedes-Benz SLK (facelift)
 Morgan Aeromax
 Renault Koleos
 Renault Twingo RS
 Subaru Legacy 2.0D flat-4 turbodiesel
 Toyota iQ
 Toyota Urban Cruiser
 Volkswagen Scirocco
 Volvo XC60

Concept cars

 Aston Martin V12 Vantage RS
 Audi R8 V12 TDI
 BYD F3DM
 Espace X80
 Fioravanti Hidra
 Giugiaro Quaranta
 Hyundai HED-5 i-Mode
 IED Maserati Chicane
 Kia Soul
 Land Rover LRX
 Mitsubishi Prototype-S
 Morgan LIFEcar
 Pininfarina Sintesi
 Renault Mégane Coupé Concept
 Rinspeed sQuba
 Saab 9-X Biohybrid
 Sbarro Alcador GTB
 SEAT Bocanegra
 Suzuki A-Star
 Opel Meriva
 Toyota 1/X

2007
The 2007 Geneva Auto Show was held from 8–18 March 2007. The following vehicles were introduced:

Production cars

 Abarth Grande Punto
 Audi A5
 Alpina B3 (E90)
 Audi S5
 Bentley Brooklands
 BMW 1 Series (E87) 5-door (facelift) & 3-door
 BMW 5 Series (E60) (facelift)
 BMW M5 (E60) Touring
 Cadillac CTS (European introduction)
 Cadillac Escalade (European introduction)
 Cadillac SRX facelift
 Cadillac STS-V (European introduction)
 Cadillac XLR-V (European introduction)
 Chevrolet HHR (European introduction)
 Citroën C4 Picasso 5-seater
 Citroën C-Crosser
 Daihatsu Cuore (European introduction)
 Diatto Ottovù Zagato
 Fiat Bravo
 Ford C-MAX facelift
 Ford Mondeo Mk3
 Gumpert Apollo Sport
 Hyundai i30
 Kia cee'd Wagon
 Koenigsegg CCXR
 Lamborghini Gallardo Superleggera
 Lexus IS-F (European introduction)
 Lexus LS600h/600hL (European introduction)
 Lotus 2-Eleven
 Maserati GranTurismo Coupé
 Mazda 2
 Mercedes-Benz C-Class
 Mercedes-Benz G-Class (facelift)
 MINI Cooper D & One
 Mitsubishi Outlander (European introduction)
 Nissan 350Z facelift
 Nissan X-Trail
 Opel Agila
 Opel Corsa OPC
 Pagani Zonda R
 Peugeot 207 CC
 Peugeot 207 GTi
 Peugeot 4007
 Mégane Renault Sport dCi
 Renault Scénic Conquest
 Saab 9-3 BioPower
 Renault Twingo
 Rolls-Royce Phantom Drophead Coupe
 Škoda Fabia
 Smart Fortwo Brabus
 Subaru R1e EV (European introduction)
 Suzuki SX4 Saloon (European introduction)
 Suzuki Wagon R+
 Toyota Auris 3-door
 Volkswagen Golf Variant
 Volkswagen Passat BlueMotion
 Volvo V70

Concept cars

 Bertone Barchetta roadster
 BMW M3
 Dodge Demon Roadster
 EDAG LUV
 Fioravanti Thalia
 Giugiaro Vadho
 Honda Small Hybrid Sports Concept
 Hyundai QarmaQ
 Kia ex cee'd Convertible
 Kia Rio Hybrid (European introduction)
 KTM X-Bow
 Jaguar C-XF
 Lexus LF-A (European introduction)
 Mazda Hakaze
 Opel GTC
 Peugeot 207 SW Outdoor
 Peugeot 4007 Holland & Holland
 Proton Gen-2 EVE Hybrid
 Rinspeed eXasis
 Russo-Baltique Impression
 Saab BioPower100
 Spyker C12 Zagato
 Tata Elegante
 Toyota FT-HS Hybrid Sport (European introduction)
 Toyota Hybrid X

In addition, Subaru introduced its new boxer diesel engine, and Honda showed its next generation clean diesel engine.

Alternative propulsion section
Bolloré Bluecar
Fiat Panda, hybrid petrol -natural gas.
Ford Focus Turnier 2.0
Honda FCX Clarity
Opel Corsa D, with optimized 100HP 1.6l natural gas engine. Serial production will be evaluated.
Reva Greeny AC1 and AC1 Z (G-Wiz in the UK)
Subaru R1e, small electric city car, with a battery that can be 80% recharged in just 15 minutes.

2006
The following introductions were featured at the 2006 Geneva show was held from March 3–19, 2006

Production cars

 A.D. Tramontana
 Alfa Romeo Spider
 Alfa Romeo 159 Sportwagon
 Audi allroad quattro
 BMW Z4
 Chevrolet Captiva
 Chevrolet Epica
 Daihatsu Terios
 Dodge Nitro EU-Spec.
 Ferrari 599 GTB Fiorano
 Fiat Sedici
 Ford Focus CC
 Ford Galaxy
 Ford S-MAX
 Honda Accord (update)
 Hyundai Accent
 Hyundai Santa Fe
 Kia Carnival
 Kia Sorento (facelift)
 Koenigsegg CCX
 Lamborghini Murciélago LP640
 Lexus LS 460
 Lotus Europa S
 Maserati GranSport MC Victory edition
 Mazda3 MPS/Mazdaspeed3
 Mercedes-Benz CL-Class
 Mercedes-Benz CLK63 AMG
 Mercedes-Benz CLS63 AMG
 Mercedes-Benz S65 AMG
 Mercedes-Benz SL55 AMG (update)
 Mitsubishi Colt CZC
 Mitsubishi L200
 Mini Cooper JCW GP
 Opel GT
 Pagani Zonda Roadster F
 Peugeot 207
 Porsche 911 (997) Turbo
 Porsche 911 (997) GT3
 Renault Megane (facelift)
 Renault Megane CC (facelift)
 Renault Espace (update)
 Škoda Roomster
 Subaru B9 Tribeca
 Suzuki SX4
 Toyota Prius (update)
 Toyota Yaris T Sport
 Tramontana
 Volvo S80

Concept cars

 Alfa Romeo Diva
 Bertone Fiat Suagnà
 Bolloré Bluecar
 Castagna CrossUp
 Castagna Imperial Landaulet
 Logan Steppe
 Dodge Hornet
 EDAG Biwak
 Fioravanti Skill – based on Fiat Punto
 Honda Civic Type-R Concept
 Hyundai HED-2 Genus
 Kia Cee'd
 Loremo LS
 Lotus APX
 Mitsubishi Concept-EZ MIEV
 Mini Concept Genevé
 Nissan Terranaut
 Nissan Pivo
 Peugeot 207 RCup
 Peugeot 407 Macarena by Heuliez
 Renault Altica
 Rinspeed zaZen
 Rolls-Royce 101EX 2-door coupé
 Saab Aero-X
 SEAT Ibiza Vaillante
 Spyker D12 Peking-to-Paris
 Tata Cliffrider
 Toyota Fine-T
 Toyota Urban Cruiser
 Volkswagen Concept A

2005
The following introductions were made at the 2005 Geneva show:

Production cars

 Alfa Romeo 159
 Alfa Romeo Brera
 Aston Martin V8 Vantage
 Audi A6 Avant (C6)
 Audi RS4 (B7)
 Audi TT Quattro Sport
 Bentley Continental Flying Spur
 BMW 3 Series (E90)
 BMW M6
 BMW 7 Series (facelift)
 Chevrolet Matiz
 Chevrolet Kalos
 Citroën C1
 Citroën C6
 Daihatsu Sirion
 Dodge Caliber
 Ferrari F430 Spider
 Fiat Croma
 Hyundai Grandeur
 Kia Rio
 Lexus IS
 Lotus Exige Sport 240R
 Maybach 57 S
 Mazda MX-5 Roadster
 Mercedes-Benz B-Class
 Mitsubishi Colt CZC
 Peugeot 107
 Opel Zafira
 Opel Zafira OPC
 Opel Astra OPC
 Rolls-Royce Phantom EWB
 Saab 9-3 SportCombi
 Spyker C12 La Turbie
 Subaru B9 Tribeca
 Toyota Aygo
 Volkswagen Passat (B6)
Volkswagen Polo (facelift)

Concept cars

 Bertone Cadillac Villa
 Cadillac BLS
 Dodge Caliber
 Fenomenon Stratos
 Fioravanti Lancia Kandahar
 Ford SAV
 Honda Civic
 Hyundai HED-1
 Lamborghini Concept S
 Laraki Borac
 Maserati Birdcage 75th 
 Mitsubishi Colt Coupé-Cabriolet
 Mitsubishi Nessie
 Nissan Zaroot
 Peugeot 407 Prologue Coupe
 Renault Zoe
 Rinspeed Chopster
 Rinspeed Senso
 Škoda Yeti
 Stola S86 Diamante
 Tata Xover

2004
The following introductions were made from 4 to 14 March 2004 at the Geneva show:

Production cars

 Alfa Romeo Crosswagon Q4
 Audi A6 (C6)
 BMW 5 Series (E60) Touring
 MINI Cabriolet
 Chevrolet Corvette Convertible
 Chrysler Crossfire SRT-6
 Citroën C3 XTR
 Fiat Multipla
 Ford Fiesta ST
 Hyundai Tucson
 Jaguar XK8
 Jaguar XKR
 Jeep Grand Cherokee "Black Pearl"
 Koenigsegg CCR
 Laraki Fulgura
 Lotus Exige
 Maserati GranSport
 Maserati MC 12
 Mercedes-Benz CLS-Class (W219)
 Mercedes-Benz SLK55 AMG
 Mercedes-Benz SLK-Class
 Opel Tigra TwinTop
 Peugeot 407
 SEAT Altea
 Škoda Octavia
 Toyota Corolla Verso

Concept cars

 Aston Martin V12 Vanquish Roadster Zagato
 Bertone Aston Martin Jet 2
 BMW Concept M5
 DC Design Go
 EDAG genX
 Fiat Trepiùno
 Fiat Idea 5Terre
 Fioravanti Kite
 Ford Fiesta RS
 Hyundai E3
 Italdesign Alfa Romeo Visconti
 Italdesign Toyota Alessandro Volta
 Jaguar BlackJag (by Fuore Design)
 Mazda MX-Flexa
 Nissan Qashqai
 Opel Trixx
 Peugeot 407 Silhouette
 Renault Modus
 Renault Wind concept
 Rinspeed Splash
 Rolls-Royce 100EX Centenary
 Stola S85 Limousine
 Tata Indigo Advent
 Toyota Motor Triathlon Race Car
 Valmet Audi A4 Coupe-Cabrio
 Volkswagen Concept C
 Volvo YCC

2003
The following introductions were made at the 2003 Geneva show:

Production cars

 Alfa Romeo GT
 Alfa Romeo GTV Coupe
 Alfa Romeo Spider
 Alpina B7 (E65) (prototype)
 Audi A3
 Bentley Continental GT
 BMW M3 CSL
 Daihatsu Cuore
 Ferrari Challenge Stradale
 Fiat Punto (facelift)
 Fiat Idea
 Kia Opirus
 Lamborghini Gallardo
 Lancia Ypsilon
 Mitsubishi Outlander
 Opel Signum
 Opel Zafira (facelift)
 Pagani Zonda Roadster
 Peugeot 307 CC
 Porsche Carrera GT
 Renault Scénic
 Saab 9-3 Convertible
 SEAT Ibiza Cupra R
 Toyota Avensis
 Volkswagen Touran

Concept cars

 Al Araba 1
 Alfa Romeo Kamal
 Aston Martin AMV8 Vantage
 Audi Nuvolari
 Bertone Birusa
 Chrysler Airflite
 Citroën C2 Sport
 DC Design Gaia
 Fiat Marrakech
 Mazda MX Sportif
 Mitsubishi CZ2 Cabrio
 Nissan Evalia
 Italdesign Chevrolet Corvette Moray
 Opel GTC Genève
 Peugeot Hoggar
 Pininfarina Enjoy
 Rinspeed Bedouin
 Subaru B11S (by Fuore Design)
 Tata Indica
 Valmet Thunderbird Retractable Glass Roof
 Volvo VCC

2002
The following introductions were made at the 2002 Geneva show:

Production cars

 Audi RS6
 Bentley Arnage R
 Chevrolet Kalos
 Citroën C8
 Ford Fusion
 Hyundai Getz
 Ferrari 575M Maranello
 Fiat Ulysse
 Koenigsegg CC8S
 Lancia Phedra
 Maybach 57 and 62
 Opel Vectra
 Peugeot 206 SW
 Peugeot 307 SW
 Peugeot 807
 Rover 75 Vanden Plas
 Saab 9-3
 Volkswagen Phaeton

Concept cars

 Alfa Romeo Brera
 BMW CS1
 DC Design Infidel
 EDAG Keinath GT/C Convertible
 Fioravanti Yak
 Hispano-Suiza HS21-GTS
 Laraki Fulgura
 Mazda MX Sport Runabout
 Mitsubishi CZ2
 Nissan Yanya
 Opel Concept M
 Peugeot RC Diamonds
 Renault Espace
 Rinspeed Presto
 Rover TCV
 Saab Novanta
 Škoda Tudor
 Toyota UUV
 Volvo ACC 2

2001
The following major introductions were made at the 2001 Geneva show:

Production cars

 Aston Martin V12 Vanquish
 BMW 3 Series Compact
 BMW M3
 Mini Hatch
 Fiat Stilo
 Ford Focus RS
 Honda Civic Type R
 Hyundai Terracan
 Jaguar X-Type
 Lexus IS 300 Sportcross
 Lancia Thesis
 Lotec Sirius
 Maserati 3200 GT Assetto Corsa
 Mercedes-Benz A-Class (facelift)
 MG ZT
 Mitsubishi Lancer Evolution VII
 Opel Astra Cabriolet
 Opel Astra Coupe OPC Xtreme
 Opel Zafira OPC
 Porsche 911 GT2
 Peugeot 307
 Renault Clio II (facelift)
 Renault Vel Satis
 Rover 75 Tourer (estate)
 Toyota Avensis Verso
 Volkswagen Passat W8

Concept cars

 Aston Martin Twenty Twenty
 Bertone Opel Filo
 Citroën Osée
 EDAG Keinath GT/C Sport Coupe
 Fioravanti Alfa Romeo Vola
 Ford Mondeo ST
 Ford StreetKa
 Italdesign Aston Martin Twenty Twenty
 Italdesign Maserati 320S
 Hispano-Suiza K8
 KAZ Eliica
 Mazda MX Sport Tourer
 Nissan Chappo
 Peugeot 307 Cameleo
 Rinspeed Advantige Rone
 Sbarro Christelle
 Smart Crossblade
 Zagato Toyota VM180

2000
The following introductions were made at the 2000 Geneva show:

Production cars

 Alfa Romeo 156 Sportswagon
 Audi A6 Allroad Quattro
 Ferrari 360 Spider
 Ford Galaxy
 Keinath GTR V8
 Morgan Aero8
 Opel Speedster
 Opel Omega V8
 Renault Scénic RX4
 Rolls-Royce Park Ward
 Toyota Previa
 Volkswagen Sharan

Concept cars

 Bertone Slim
 Bertrandt Competence Car
 BMW X5 (E53) Le Mans
 Cadillac Imaj
 Citroën Xsara Dynactive
 Coggiola T-Rex
 Dodge Intrepid ESX3
 Hispano-Suiza HS21
 Maserati Buran
 Mazda 626 MPS
 Peugeot 607 Feline
 Peugeot 607 Paladine
 Renault Koleos
 Rinspeed Tattoo
 Sbarro GT12
 Sbarro Montres
 SEAT Salsa
 Tata Aria
 Toyota NCSV (European debut)
 Toyota Yaris Cabrio Concept
 Valmet RaceAbout

1990s

1999
The following concepts and major launches featured at the 1999 Geneva show:

Production cars

 Aston Martin V8 Vantage Le Mans
 Audi TT Roadster
 BMW 3 Series (E46) Coupe
 De Tomaso Mangusta
 Ferrari 360 Modena
 Mazda Premacy
 Ford Racing Puma
 Lamborghini Diablo GT
 Mercedes-Benz CL-Class
 Mitsubishi Pajero Pinin
 Nissan Almera Tino
 Pagani Zonda C12
 Peugeot 406 Break
 Porsche 996 GT3
 Renault Mégane

Concept cars

 Bentley Hunaudières
 Alfa Romeo Bella by Bertone
 Bugatti EB218
 Citroën C6 Lignage (developed into Citroën C6, launched in 2005)
 Ford Focus Cosworth
 Ford Mondeo ST250 ECO
 I.DE.A One
 Heuliez Pregunta
 Opel Concept A
 Opel Speedster (production model launched in 2000)
 Peugeot 306 HDi
 Sbarro GT1
 Seat Fórmula
 SEAT Toledo Cupra
 Renault Avantime (production model launched in 2001)
 Rinspeed X-Trem
 Valmet Zerone

1998
The following concepts and major launches featured at the 1998 Geneva show:

Production cars

 Audi A6 Avant
 BMW 3 Series (E46)
 BMW M5 (E39)
 Callaway C12 Coupe (1998-2004)
 Citroën Xsara Break
 Daewoo Matiz 
 Ferrari 456M GT
 Ford Focus
 Jaguar XKR
 Lexus IS 200
 Mercedes-Benz CLK-Class (C208) Convertible
 Mercedes-Benz E55 AMG Estate
 Porsche 911 (996)
 Renault Clio
 Rolls-Royce Silver Seraph
 Suzuki Grand Vitara
 Toyota Yaris
 Volkswagen Golf Cabriolet
 Volvo C70 Cabriolet

Concept cars

 Bertone Pickster
 Chrysler Pronto Cruiser
 Fioravanti F100
 Hyundai Euro 1
 Peugeot Two-oh-heart
 Renault Zo
 Rinspeed E-Go Rocket
 SEAT Bolero 330 BT
 Volkswagen W12 Roadster

1997
The following introductions were made at the 1997 Geneva show:

Production cars

 Audi A8
 Ferrari 550 Maranello
 Ford Puma
 Mercedes-Benz A190
 Opel Corsa
 Peugeot 306
 Volkswagen Passat Variant

Concept cars

 Bertone Alfa Romeo Sportut
 Italdesign Alfa Romeo Scighera
 Opel Signum Concept (production model launched 2003)
 Pininfarina Peugeot Nautilus
 Rover Mini Spiritual & Spiritual Too
 Daewoo Shiraz

1996
The following introductions were made at the 1996 Geneva show:

Production cars

 Ferrari 456 GTA
 Jaguar XK
 Lamborghini Diablo SV-R (race car)
 Lotus Esprit V8
 Mega Monte Carlo
 Renault Scénic (first production compact MPV in Europe)

Concept cars

 Ford Lynx
 Ford Synergy 2010
 Opel Slalom
 Peugeot 406 Toscana
 Renault Fiftie
 Rinspeed Yello Talbo
 Sbarro Alfa Romeo Issima
 Zagato Raptor

1995
The following introductions were made at the 1995 Geneva show:

Production cars

 Alfa Romeo GTV and Spider
 Alfa Romeo 146
 Ferrari F50
 Lamborghini Diablo SV
 Lancia Delta HPE
 Renault Sport Spider
 MG F

Concept cars

 Lamborghini Calà
 Lancia Kayak
 Opel Maxx
 Renault Laguna Evado
 Rinspeed Roadster SC-R
 Sbarro Alcador
 Sbarro Mandarine

1994
The following introductions were made at the 1994 Geneva show:

Production cars

 Audi A8
 Ferrari 333 SP
 Ferrari F355 Berlinetta
 Fiat Ulysse
 Land Rover Discovery
 Maserati Ghibli (AM336) facelift
 Mercedes-Benz S600 L
 Peugeot 806
 Rolls-Royce Flying Spur
 Saab 900S Convertible
 Toyota RAV4

Concept cars

 Bentley Java
 Bertone Karisma
 Lexus Landau
 Renault Argos
 Rinspeed Cyan
 Sbarro Alfa Romeo 155 Sport Wagon Q4
 Sbarro Oxalys
 Volkswagen Concept One Cabriolet

1993
The following introductions were made at the 1993 Geneva show:

Production cars

Aston Martin DB7
Audi S4
BMW 325i Convertible
BMW 840Ci
Citroën Xantia
Daihatsu Charade
Ferrari 348 Spider
Ford Maverick (first production SUV in Ford range)
Ford Mondeo (Ford's "world car", to be built in different versions for Europe, North America and Australia)
Lamborghini Diablo VT
Lancia Delta
Mazda Xedos 6
Mercedes-Benz 300 SD
Mitsubishi Galant
Nissan Terrano II
Opel Astra Cabrio
Opel Corsa
Peugeot 306
Porsche 911 Carrera 4 Coupe Turbolook "30 Jahre 911"
Porsche 968 Turbo RS
Volvo 850 GLE
Volvo 850 GLT

Concept cars

 Aston Martin Lagonda Vignale Concept (Ghia)
 BMW Z13
 Bugatti EB 112 (ItalDesign)
 De Tomaso Guarà Coupe Prototype
 De Tomaso Guarà Barchetta Prototype
 Esoro E301
 Ferrari FZ93 (Zagato)
 Fiat Downtown Concept
 Fiat Lucciola Concept (ItalDesign)
 Mercedes-Benz Coupe Studie Concept
 Pininfarina Ethos 2
 Renault Racoon
 Rinspeed Veleno
 Sbarro Isatis
 Sbarro Urbi
 Sbarro Citroën ZX Onyx
 Vector Avtech WX3-R Roadster
 Vector Avtech WX3

1992
The following introductions were made at the 1992 Geneva show:

Production cars

 Alfa Romeo 155
 Aston Martin Virage Volante
 Bugatti EB110 Supersport
 Ferrari 512 TR
 Porsche 911 Turbo S Leichtbau (964)
 Renault Safrane (new flagship model in Renault range)
 Toyota Carina E (first European built Toyota, produced at a new factory near Derby)

Concept cars

 Lamborghini Diablo Roadster Concept
 Opel Twin
 Sbarro Astro

1991
The following introductions were made at the 1991 Geneva show:

Production cars

 Aston Martin Virage Volante 2+2
 Bentley Continental R
 BMW 3 Series (E36) 
 Mazda Eunos 30X
 Mercedes-Benz S-Class (W140)
 Mitsubishi Pajero
 Opel Frontera

Concept cars

 Alfa Romeo Proteo
 Pininfarina Opel Chronos
 Sbarro Helios

1990
The following introductions were made at the 1990 Geneva show:

Concept cars 

 Jaguar Kensington
 SEAT Proto TL
 Volvo 480 convertible

1980s

1989
The following introductions were made at the 1989 Geneva show:
Alfa Romeo SZ (originally called ES 30)
Alpina B10 Bi-Turbo
Chevrolet Corvette ZR-1
Daihatsu Applause
Ford Fiesta Urba concept
Ford Via concept (Ghia)
Lancia Delta Integrale 16v
 Lotus Carlton (high performance version of Vauxhall Carlton)
Mercedes-Benz 500SL
Peugeot Agades concept (Heuliez)
Sbarro Osmos concept

1988
The following introductions were made at the 1988 Geneva show:

 Ford Saguaro concept (Ghia)
Maserati Karif
Sbarro Robur concept

1987
The following introductions were made at the 1987 Geneva show:

Aston Martin Lagonda (Series 4)
Sbarro Monster G concept

1986
The following introductions were made at the 1986 Geneva show:

Aston Martin V8 Zagato coupe
BMW 524d (E28)
Citroën Eole concept
Rover CCV concept
Sbarro Challenge 2+2 concept
Volvo 480 (first front-wheel drive Volvo)
Zender Vision 3C concept

1985
The following introductions were made at the 1985 Geneva show:

Autobianchi Y10
Ferrari 412
Lamborghini Countach LP5000 S Quattrovalvole
Michelotti PAC (city car prototype)
Peugeot Griffe 4 concept (Pininfarina)
Sbarro Challenge concept
Sbarro Super Five 
Volvo 780

1984
The following introductions were made at the 1984 Geneva show:

 Alfa Romeo 33 1.5 Giardinetta (Estate in the UK)
Alfa Romeo Tempo Libero concept (Zagato)
 Ferrari 288 GTO
Ford APV concept (Ghia)
 Lamborghini Jalpa P350
Sbarro Super Eight concept
Sbarro Mercedes Benz Biturbo
 Zagato Z33 "Free Time"

1983
The following introductions were made at the 1983 Geneva show:

Alfa Romeo Delfino concept
Alfa Romeo Zeta Sei concept (Zagato)
Fiat Ritmo Coupe concept (Pininfarina)
Ford Trio concept (Ghia)
Lincoln Quicksilver concept
Renault Gabbiano concept (Italdesign)

1982
The following introductions were made at the 1982 Geneva show:

Bentley Mulsanne Turbo
Lamborghini LMA002 prototype
Michelotti CVT 58 concept
Opel Corsa Spider concept 
Sbarro Super Twelve concept
Volkswagen Golf GTD (Mk1)

1981
The following introductions were made at the 1981 Geneva show:

AC Ghia concept 
Audi Quartz concept (Pininfarina)
Covini B24 concept
Felber Roberta (Lancia Delta based)
Ford Avant Garde concept (Ghia)
Ford Cockpit concept (Ghia)
Lamborghini LM001
Lamborghini Miura P400 SVJ Spider one-off
Lamborghini Jalpa
Lola Ultimo concept (Michelotti)
Wolfrace Sonic

1980
The following introductions were made at the 1980 Geneva show:

Audi Quattro
Felber Illustre (Audi 80 (B2) based)
 Felber Pasha (Buick Skylark based)
Ferrari Mondial 8
Fiat Panda
Fiat Ritmo D
Ford Granada Altair concept (Ghia)
Reliant Scimitar GTE SE6B

1970s

1979
The following introductions were made at the 1979 Geneva show:

 Felber Rubis 112 (Autobianchi A112 based)
Isuzu Asso di Fiori concept (Italdesign)
Monteverdi Military

1978 
The following introductions were made at the 1978 Geneva show:

Dome Zero prototype
Felber Excellence spider
Ford Megastar II concept (Ghia) 
Ford Mustang III concept (Ghia)
Lancia Gamma Spider (Pininfarina)

1977
The following introductions were made at the 1977 Geneva show:

Ferrari 365 GTC/4 "Break" by Felber (one-off)
Felber Excellence coupe
Lamborghini Cheetah prototype
Pininfarina Ferrari 308 GTB Millechiodi aerodynamic study
Porsche 928

1976
The following introductions were made at the 1976 Geneva show:

Alfa Romeo Navajo concept
Alfasud 5m
Ferrari 365 GTC/4 Beach car by Felber (one-off)
Lamborghini Silhouette
Lancia Gamma
Maserati Kyalami

1975
The following introductions were made at the 1975 Geneva show:

 Ferrari 208 GT4
Felber Lancia FF concept (Lancia D24 Spider Replica) (Lancia Fulvia based)
Ford Capri S
Lancia Beta HPE
 Maserati Merak SS
 Monteverdi Palm Beach concept
 Peugeot 604

1974
The following introductions were made at the 1974 Geneva show:
 Citroën CX (new flagship Citroën saloon, and winner of the European Car of the Year award for 1975)
Felber Ferrari FF (Ferrari 166 Spider Corsa Replica) (Ferrari 330 GTC based)
Lamborghini Countach LP400
Mercedes-Benz 450SEL 6.9
Sbarro BMW 328 replica
Sbarro Stash
 Volkswagen Scirocco

1973
The following introductions were made at the 1973 Geneva show:

Autobianchi A112 Giovani concept
Filipinetti X1/9 race car
Lamborghini Countach third prototype
Sbarro Tiger concept
Sbarro SV-1 concept
Volkswagen Scirocco

1972
The following introductions were made at the 1972 Geneva show:

 Citroën GS Camargue concept
 Ferrari Dino 246 GTS
 Opel Commodore B
 Ranger B (1700/1900/2500)
Volvo VESC concept

1971
The following introductions were made at the 1971 Geneva show:

Alpine A310
Hispano Alemán Vizcaya 914/6 by Frua
Lamborghini Countach LP500 prototype
Maserati Bora
 Monteverdi 375/4
 Monteverdi High Speed 375 C

1970
The following introductions were made at the 1970 Geneva show:

 Alfa Romeo Montreal
 Citroën SM (High performance coupe built by Citroën in a venture with Maserati)
Ferrari Modulo concept
Ford Capri RS2600 partial mockup
Matra M530LX
 Mercedes-Benz C111-II Concept
 Monteverdi Hai 450
Range Rover
Volvo GTZ 3000 concept

1960s

1969
The following introductions were made at the 1969 Geneva show:
Ferrari Sigma
Lancia Fulvia Berlinetta Competizione concept
Maserati Indy
Peugeot 504 Coupe
Porsche 917

1968
The following introductions were made at the 1968 Geneva show:

 Lamborghini Espada 400 GT
Lamborghini Islero
 Lombardi Grand Prix
Mercedes-Benz 300 SEL 6.3

1967
The following introductions were made at the 1967 Geneva show:

Lamborghini Marzal concept
Matra 530
Mercedes-Benz 250SL

1966
The following introductions were made at the 1966 Geneva show:

Alfa Romeo Giulia Sprint GT Veloce
 Alvis TF 21
Bizzarrini 5300 Spyder S.I. prototype
BMW 1600-2
 Ferrari 330 GTC
Ferrari 365
Isuzu 117 Coupé prototype
 Lamborghini 400 GT 2+2
Lamborghini Miura P400 prototype
Vauxhall XVR concept

1965
The following introductions were made at the 1965 Geneva show:

 Alfa Romeo Giulia GTC (public debut)
 Alfa Romeo Giulia Super (public debut)
 Fiat 850 Coupe
 Renault 16
 TVR Trident (Fissore)

1964
The following introductions were made at the 1964 Geneva show:

Abarth 2400 coupe (Allemano) (one-off)
Ferrari 500 Superfast
Lamborghini 350 GT
Porsche 904

1963
The following introductions were made at the 1963 Geneva show:

Chevrolet Testudo concept (Bertone)
Fiat 2300 Cabriolet Speciale prototype (Pininfarina)
Jaguar D-Type rebodied by Michelotti
Mercedes-Benz 230SL

1962
The following introductions were made at the 1962 Geneva show:

 Alfa Romeo 2600
Alfa Romeo Giulietta Sprint Speciale Coupe
Ferrari 250 GT Bertone (one-off)
Ferrari Superfast III (Pininfarina)
Maserati Sebring 
Simca 1000 Coupé

1961
The following introductions were made at the 1961 Geneva show:

 Jaguar E-Type (British-built luxury sports coupe and roadster) (Driven overnight to the stadium) 
Lancia Appia Sport
Volvo P1800

1960
The following introductions were made at the 1960 Geneva show:

Alfa Romeo Giulietta SZ 
Alfa Romeo Superflow IV show car
Ferrari 250 GT California Spyder SWB
Gordon-Keeble GT
O.S.C.A. 1500 Coupe (Fissore)
Triumph Herald Convertible (small four-seater open top saloon car)

1950s

1959
The following introductions were made at the 1959 Geneva show:

Abarth 850 Coupe Scorpione (Allemano)
Abarth 850 Spider Riviera (Allemano)
Alfa Romeo Spider Super Sport show car
Berkeley B95
Berkeley B105
Lancia Appia (third series)
 Simca Fulgur
Scimitar (aluminum prototypes designed by Brooks Stevens)

1958
The following introductions were made at the 1958 Geneva show:

Arbel Symétric (second version)
Cadillac Skylight Coupe (Pininfarina)
Studebaker-Packard Astral

1957
The following introductions were made at the 1957 Geneva show:

Abarth 750 Coupe Goccia (Vignale)
Ferrari 250 GT Cabriolet Pininfarina Series I
Lancia Appia Coupé 
Rometsch Lawrence

1956
The following introductions were made at the 1956 Geneva show:

Abarth 215A Coupé Bertone concept
Ferrari 250 GT Coupé Boano
Ferrari 250 GT Berlinetta "no-louvre"
Fiat 600 Multipla Marine (Pininfarina)
Lancia Appia (second series)
Soletta 750 concept

1955
The following introductions were made at the 1955 Geneva show:

 Fiat 1100 TV Trasformabile
Fiat 8V Berlinetta Speciale (Pininfarina)
 Maserati A6G/54 Zagato Spider

1954
The following introductions were made at the 1954 Geneva show:

 Fiat 1100 Familiare

1953
The following introductions were made at the 1953 Geneva show:

Ferrari 250 MM
Fiat 1100
Lancia Aurelia PF200 C Spider (Pininfarina)
Rometsch Beeskow (won the "Golden Rose of Geneva" award)

1952
The following introductions were made at the 1952 Geneva show:

Fiat 8V

1951
The following introductions were made at the 1951 Geneva show:

Arbel Symétric (first version)

1950
The following introductions were made at the 1950 Geneva show:

 Fiat 1400

1940s

1949
The following introductions were made at the 1949 Geneva show:

 Borgward Hansa 1500
Isotta Fraschini Tipo 8C Monterosa Special Sedan (Touring)
Porsche 356

1947
The following introductions were made at the 1947 Geneva show:

 Maserati A6 1500 Berlinetta Speciale (Pininfarina)

1920s

See also
 Premiere
 Peugeot Concours Design
 Science and technology in Switzerland

References

External links

 

Events in Geneva
Auto shows
Science and technology in Switzerland
1905 establishments in Switzerland
Electric vehicles in Switzerland
Tourist attractions in Geneva
Recurring events established in 1905
Spring (season) events in Switzerland